Aurore Auteuil (born 28 March 1981) is a French actress and the eldest daughter of Anne Jousset and Daniel Auteuil.

Filmography

Bibliography

External links

1981 births
Living people
French film actresses
People from Neuilly-sur-Seine
21st-century French actresses
French stage actresses
French television actresses